Steven Lawrence Whitmire (born September 24, 1959) is an American puppeteer, known primarily for his work on The Muppets and Sesame Street. Beginning his involvement with the Muppets in 1978, Whitmire inherited the roles of Ernie and Kermit the Frog after Jim Henson's death in 1990; he performed the characters until 2014 and 2016, respectively. As part of the Muppet cast, he has appeared in multiple feature films and television series, performing a variety of characters on The Muppet Show, Sesame Street, and Fraggle Rock and during such occupations has been employed by The Jim Henson Company, Sesame Workshop, and The Muppets Studio.

Career
Whitmire first appeared (unpaid) at a pre-show event at Six Flags Over Georgia. He performed with his then alter-ego puppet Otis for the children waiting to see a multimedia show.

Before graduating high school, Whitmire had his first "professional" puppeteering job using Otis at "The World of Sid & Marty Krofft" in Atlanta, the first indoor theme park. From there Whitmire appeared on local Atlanta TV live for 2 1/2 hours every day on "The Kids Show with Otis" taking telephone calls from children and adults.  The show received more than 2000 calls per hour. WATL was owned at that time by former Atlanta children's television host "Officer Don" Kennedy. Otis made appearances on various WATL 36 shows with Atlanta's Ludlow Porch, performing with the Georgia Bulldogs' Larry Munson, Don Kennedy, and Entertainment Page host Artie Goodman. As Otis, Whitmire interviewed Olivia Newton-John during a tour promoting an album.

He worked with puppets after graduating high school, and eventually got a job working on The Muppet Show in 1978. Since then, Whitmire performed in almost every major Henson company project, including non-Muppet projects such as The Dark Crystal, Labyrinth, and Dinosaurs.

Characters performed
Whitmire was the second performer of two signature Muppets—Kermit the Frog and Ernie—after the death of their creator and original performer Jim Henson (with whom he shared a birthday) in 1990. Whitmire was personally asked by Brian Henson and Jane Henson to be Kermit's performer a few weeks after Jim Henson's death. Heather Henson arranged for a Kermit puppet to be sent to Whitmire's residence; however, Whitmire hid the puppet away for weeks before deciding on taking on the role. Following the death of Richard Hunt and the retirement of Jerry Nelson, Whitmire took over the roles of Beaker and Statler, respectively. In 2014, Billy Barkhurst took over the role of Ernie, with Peter Linz taking over that role in 2017.

Muppet characters original to Whitmire include Rizzo the Rat, Lips (the trumpet player from Dr. Teeth and The Electric Mayhem), Foo-Foo (Miss Piggy's dog), Wembley Fraggle and Sprocket the Dog on Fraggle Rock, and Bean Bunny, a character that originated in The Tale of the Bunny Picnic (1986).

Whitmire voiced Link Hogthrob in the Muppet RaceMania and Muppets Party Cruise video games. He also performed Link for the 2011 film The Muppets. This was the first speaking appearance of the character since the death of Jim Henson, the original performer of Link. He also performed him in Muppets Most Wanted. In 2008, Whitmire took over another of Jim Henson's roles, The Muppet Newsman.

Dismissal from the Muppets
In July 2017, The Muppets Studio announced that Whitmire was no longer involved with the Muppets and that fellow Muppet performer Matt Vogel was cast as Kermit's new performer. Whitmire revealed that he was dismissed from his roles in October 2016 because of undisclosed issues that he said had not been discussed before his dismissal. In their decision-making, The Walt Disney Company (owner of The Muppets Studio) consulted the Henson family, who supported the recasting of Kermit and Whitmire's dismissal.

Brian Henson stated that issues with Whitmire began in the mid-1990s, and said that Whitmire would make "outrageous demands and often played brinkmanship", and additionally stated that Whitmire would "send emails and letters attacking everyone, attacking the writing and attacking the director". He also expressed guilt for not dismissing Whitmire and recasting Kermit before selling the Muppets to Disney in 2004, "because I knew that it was going to be a real problem". Lisa Henson stated that Whitmire was opposed to having an understudy for Kermit and refused to train one, which became problematic when it came to "B-level performances, such as a ribbon-cutting," at some of which she said he was unwilling to appear. She also stated that he "blackballed young performers" by refusing to appear in shows with them.

In an interview with The Hollywood Reporter that same month, Whitmire stated he was dismissed for disagreements over Kermit's characterization and prolonged labor union negotiations that delayed his involvement in Muppet productions. Whitmire alleged that Disney offered him what he called "consolation prizes" if he voluntarily left, including honoring him as a Disney Legend, under the public pretense that he would be retiring from performing. In a statement released to The New York Times, Debbie McClellan, then-head of The Muppets Studio, said that they "raised concerns about Steve’s repeated unacceptable business conduct over a period of many years, and he consistently failed to address the feedback". Whitmire has expressed an interest in making amends and resuming his role with the Muppets in the future if possible.

Personal life
Steve Whitmire has been married to Melissa Whitmire, whom he met during his senior year of attending Berkmar High School in Lilburn, Georgia, since June 1978. They live in Atlanta, Georgia.

Filmography

Film

Television

Video games

Other appearances

References

External links

 

1959 births
American puppeteers
Living people
Muppet performers
Sesame Street Muppeteers
Fraggle Rock performers